The TERI School of Advanced Studies (TERI MKC) is a higher education institute in New Delhi, India which specializes in the field of sustainable development. It was established in 1998 by TERI (The Energy and Resources Institute). In 1999, the TERI School of Advanced Studies was granted the 'Deemed to be University' status by the Indian University Grants Commission (UGC). 

The School started functioning from its campus, located in Vasant-Kunj, New Delhi in 2008 and offers Masters and PhD programs. It has started work on developing a new campus at Hyderabad, Telangana in southern India.

Campus 

The TERI School of Advanced Studies is situated at Plot No. 10, Institutional Area, in a modern green building. The campus was inaugurated by the President of India, Pratibha Devisingh Patil, on 11 September 2008. While inaugurating the green campus, the president observed that it was "an exemplary example of combining traditional values of conservation and preservation of energy while building a state of the art campus." The university puts its theory to practice by building an energy-efficient campus showcasing the concept of modern green buildings. Besides an innovative, energy-saving architectural design, the building is equipped with a number of other technologies that help reduce the energy consumption by 60% and potable water use by 25%. The campus is equipped with three types of cooling systems: the Earth Air Tunnel (EAT), Variable Refrigerant Volume System (VRV) and Thermal Mass Storage (TMS). The EAT used in the hostel block uses the heat sink property of the earth to maintain comfortable temperatures inside the building, saving up to 50% energy as compared to the conventional system.

Before moving into the Vasant Kunj campus, the university was housed in the Darbari Seth block of India Habitat Centre from 1998 to 2008.

Centers and departments

TERI SAS has six different departments and two centres: 
1. Department of Natural and Applied Sciences
2. Department of Sustainable Engineering
3. Department of Policy and Management Studies
4. Coca-Cola Department of Regional Water Studies

List of programmes

TERI SAS offers Doctoral programmes in several thematic areas and 12 Masters level programmes.

TERI SAS offers followings programmes at present:
• Ph.D.
• M.Sc. Environmental Studies and Resource Management (ESRM)
• M.Sc. Geoinformatics 
• M.Sc. Climate Science and Policy (CSP)
• M.Sc. Biotechnology 
• M.Sc. Economics 
• M.Sc. Water Science and Governance (WSG) 
• M.A. Public Policy and Sustainable Development (PPSD)
• M.A. Sustainable Development Practice (SDP)
• MBA  Sustainability Management
• M.Tech. Renewable Energy Engineering and Management (REEM)
• M.Tech. Urban Development Management (UDM)
• M.Tech. Water Resources Engineering and Management (WREM)

TERI SAS offers Doctoral Programmes (Ph.D.) in seven major thematic areas which are:
1. Bioresources and Biotechnology
2. Business Sustainability
3. Energy and Environment
4. Natural Resources Management
5. Policy Studies
6. Water Science and Governance

Administration

Prof. Prateek Sharma is the Vice-Chancellor of TERI SAS.

Events

Retopia is the annual cultural and technological festival of Department of Energy and Environment at TERI School of Advanced Studies, New Delhi. Retopia refers to an ideal state or situation, evolving from the English word 'utopia'. The objective of the festival is to bring together government, academics, industry and other practitioners on a common platform to discuss clean energy prospects on environmental, technical and commercial lines.

The 12th Convocation of TERI School of Advanced Studies (TERI SAS) was held on 14 Nov 2019. Dr Krishnaswamy Kasturirangan, one of the most recognized scientists of the country was the Chief Guest and delivered the Convocation address. Dr Shailesh Nayak, the Chancellor, TERI SAS presided over the convocation. A total of 19 doctoral and 229 master's degrees were awarded.

TERI School of Advanced Studies partnerships 
TERI School of Advanced Studies signed a memorandum of understanding (MoU) with several institutions with the aim of facilitating a mutually beneficial exchange of students, faculty, knowledge, resources, and ideas. In February 2002, TERI School of Advanced Studies entered into a memorandum of understanding with the School of Forestry and Environmental Studies of Yale University. In February 2003, TERI School of Advanced Studies signed a MoU with Donald Danforth Plant Science Center, USA. In April 2005, the University entered into a MoU with the University of Nottingham, UK. In September 2007, TERI School of Advanced Studies signed a MoU with Michigan State University, USA. In November 2007, TERI School of Advanced Studies signed a MoU with University of New South Wales, Australia. In 2007 itself TERI School of Advanced Studies signed an agreement of cooperation with Freie University Berlin, Germany. In February 2008, TERI School of Advanced Studies signed MoUs with University of Iceland, Iceland and North Carolina State University, USA. TERI School of Advanced Studies signed Mevlana staff and student exchange agreement with Akdeniz University from Antalya-Turkey in 2018.

The UNESCO Chair on Climate Science and Policy has been established in TERI School of Advanced Studies. Under this chair, the MSc in climate science and policy has been initiated with support from UNESCO.

E-learning initiatives
TERI School of Advanced Studies is a part of the Promotion of Sustainability in Postgraduate Education and Research initiative of the UNU - Institute of Advanced Studies (UNU-IAS) This is essentially a network of several leading higher education institutions in Asia and the Pacific that have committed to work together to integrate sustainable development into postgraduate courses and curricula. As a part of this initiative, a postgraduate program on public policy and sustainable development has been started in TERI School of Advanced Studies.

TERI School of Advanced Studies has been selected by the John D. MacArthur and Catherine T. MacArthur Foundation, globally headquartered in Chicago, as one of 10 universities worldwide to receive significant support in the amount of $900,000 to create a new master's degree program in Development Practice.MacArthur Foundation has awarded $7.6 million to seed the creation of Master's Development Practice (MDP) programs that will provide rigorous post-graduate training for a new generation of development experts.

TERI School of Advanced Studies newsletter 
The TERI School of Advanced Studies has a newsletter called Offprint.
The department of business sustainability has a newsletter named Connect, which has the theme of sustainability and infrastructure issues in India.

See also 
 The Energy and Resources Institute
 GRIHA
 Gopal Krishna Sarangi
 Sustainable development

References

New Delhi
Tata institutions
Universities and colleges in Delhi
Deemed universities in India
1998 establishments in Delhi
Educational institutions established in 1998